Pene may refer to:

 Pene (gastropod)
 William Pène du Bois
 Raoul Pene Du Bois
 Omar Pene
 Guy Pène du Bois
 Arran Pene
 Marie-Léontine Bordes-Pène
 El Kabir Pene

See also 
 Penne (disambiguation)